Víctor Balaguer (24 March 1921 – 17 April 1984) was a Spanish singer of the 1950s and 1960s, best known for his participation in the 1962 Eurovision Song Contest. Balaguer was known as a versatile singer who moved between popular music and zarzuela, singing in both Spanish and Catalan.

Balaguer was born and died in Barcelona.  In 1961, he took part in the selection for Spain's debut Eurovision Song Contest entry, but lost out by one point to Conchita Bautista. The following year he placed two songs in the final, and "Llámame" ("Call Me") was chosen as the Spanish representative in the seventh Eurovision Song Contest, held in Luxembourg City on 18 March.  "Llámame" was one of four songs (along with the entries from Belgium, Austria and the Netherlands) to finish in joint last place after failing to score any points from the juries.

Following his Eurovision appearance, Balaguer returned to performing mainly in his native Catalan.  He died of colorectal cancer in Barcelona on 17 April 1984, aged 63.

References

1921 births
1984 deaths
Eurovision Song Contest entrants for Spain
Eurovision Song Contest entrants of 1962
Deaths from cancer in Spain
Deaths from colorectal cancer
Singers from Barcelona
20th-century Spanish singers
20th-century Spanish male singers